Andres Nõmme (30 March 1864 Torma Parish (now Jõgeva Parish), Kreis Dorpat – 27 April 1935 Mustvee) was an Estonian politician. He was a member of II Riigikogu. He was a member of the Riigikogu since 26 May 1924. He replaced Rudolf Pächter. On 26 June 1924, he was removed from his position and he was replaced by Paul Tamm.

References

1864 births
1935 deaths
People from Jõgeva Parish
People from Kreis Dorpat
Workers' United Front politicians
Members of the Riigikogu, 1923–1926